Lorrane Cristina Versiani Ferreira (born March 17, 1993 in Belo Horizonte) is a Brazilian swimmer.

International career

At the 2018 Pan Pacific Swimming Championships in Tokyo, Japan, she finished 12th in the Women's 50 metre freestyle, and 27th in the Women's 100 metre freestyle.

At the 2019 Pan American Games held in Lima, Peru, she won a silver medal in the Mixed 4 × 100 metre freestyle relay, by participating at heats. She also finished 4th in the Women's 50 metre freestyle.

References

Living people
Brazilian female freestyle swimmers
1993 births
Sportspeople from Belo Horizonte
Swimmers at the 2019 Pan American Games
Pan American Games silver medalists for Brazil
Pan American Games medalists in swimming
Medalists at the 2019 Pan American Games
20th-century Brazilian women
21st-century Brazilian women
South American Games gold medalists for Brazil
South American Games medalists in swimming
Competitors at the 2022 South American Games